The 2009 Carlton Football Club season was the Carlton Football Club's 146th season, and 113th as a member of the Australian Football League.

Carlton finished 7th out of 16 teams in the 2009 AFL season. The season marked the first time that Carlton had played finals since 2001, ending what at that time was a club record drought of seven consecutive VFL/AFL seasons without a finals appearance. Full forward Brendan Fevola won the Coleman Medal as the league's leading goalkicker.

Club summary
The 2009 AFL season was the 113th season of the VFL/AFL competition since its inception in 1897; and, having competed in every season, it was also the 113th season contested by the Carlton Football Club.

Former club champion Stephen Kernahan continued as club president in the 2009 season, a position he had held since August 2008. Brett Ratten and Chris Judd continued in their respective roles as senior coach and captain of the club, each entering his second season appointed to the job. The club's joint major sponsors were car manufacturer Hyundai, unchanged from 2008, and national tourism promoter Tourism Malaysia, newly signed for the 2009 season. As in previous years, the club's primary home ground was Etihad Stadium – which was known until 1 March 2009 as Telstra Dome – with home games expecting to draw larger crowds played at the M.C.G.; the traditional home ground Princes Park was renamed from MC Labour Park to Visy Park in the offseason, and it continued to serve as the training and administrative base. As had been the case every year since 2003, Carlton had a full alignment with the Northern Bullants in the Victorian Football League, allowing Carlton-listed players to play with the Bullants when not selected in AFL matches.

Membership campaign: "They Know We're Coming"
The club marketed its 2009 membership campaign on what became one of the most well-remembered slogans in league history: "They Know We're Coming". CEO Greg Swann described the slogan as an irreverent way to rebuild the "Carlton arrogance" which the club was known for during its successful period, but which had been missing since the club's first wooden spoon in 2002 and in the aftermath of the salary cap breach that followed. The provocative slogan was immediately successful in generating discussion and interest, drawing scorn from many opposition fans, and notably drawing a response from traditional rivals , who published a "They Know We're Waiting" poster on its website. Carlton went on to sell 42,408 memberships for the 2009 season, a new record membership for the club, breaking the record of 40,764 set the previous season.

Squad and player statistics for 2009
Flags represent the state of origin, i.e. the state in which the player played his Under-18s football.

Playing list changes
The following summarises all player changes between the conclusion of the 2008 season and the conclusion of the 2009 season.

In

Out

List management

Season summary

Pre-season matches

NAB Cup

NAB Challenge

Home-and-away season
Carlton had a strong season. Although its win–loss record was only 6–6 after twelve rounds, four of its six losses came by less than ten points. In the final round match against , both teams were fighting for 5th place and a home elimination final; the result was Carlton's heaviest loss of the season, 72 points, which saw Carlton finish 7th, and required them to travel to Brisbane for the first week of the finals.

Carlton's full season win–loss record was 13–9, a notable improvement on its record of 10–12 from the 2008 season. The club's form throughout the season unpredictable; Carlton returned a 3–2 record against the top four teams, including an impressive Round 19 upset victory against eventual premiers , but only 2–4 against the next four teams on the ladder; Carlton's record against the bottom eight was 8–3, with all three of those losses coming inside the first seven rounds of the season.

Finals
Playing its first final since 2001, Carlton and Brisbane fought an evenly contested first half, and Brisbane took a one-point lead into half time. Carlton dominated the third quarter, kicking six goals to two; and, after a goal in the first minute of the final quarter, led by 30 points. But from there, Brisbane kicked the final six goals of the match, to overrun the Blues and win the match by seven points.

Ladder

Leading Goalkickers 
Brendan Fevola was Carlton's leading goalkicker for 2009, kicking 89 goals for the season. It was the seventh consecutive and final time that Fevola won the club goalkicking. The 89 goal tally was the second-highest of Fevola's career, second to his 99 goals in the 2008 season. Fevola also won the Coleman Medal, as his tally of 86 goals in the home-and-away season was the highest in the league.

Small forward Eddie Betts was second with 38 goals, the highest in his career at that point, and Marc Murphy was third, kicking 31 goals from the midfield.

Team awards and records
Game records
 Round 1 – Carlton's winning margin of 83 points against  was its highest in any game since Round 10, 2001.
 Round 16 – Carlton defeated Sydney for the first time since 2000, ending a twelve-game losing streak against that opponent. It was Carlton's equal-longest losing streak against any single opponent since 1902 (equal with a concurrent twelve-game losing streak against St Kilda, which was broken in 2010).
 First Elimination final – Carlton played its first finals match since the First Semi Final, 2001, on 15 September 2001, ending a club record drought of six years, 355 days between finals matches.

Season records
Carlton's finishing position (7th), win–loss record (13–9), total score (2270 points), total score conceded (2055 points) and percentage (110.46) were all the best that the club had achieved since the 2001 season.

Other

Notable events
Altercation between Setanta Ó hAilpín and Cameron Cloke
Setanta Ó hAilpín was suspended for four matches by the AFL Tribunal for striking, then kicking Cameron Cloke during an intra-club practice match in early February; the intra-club match unusually fell under the tribunal's jurisdiction because it was an AFL-sanctioned game, and was officiated by AFL umpires as part of their preseason. Ó hAilpín was also briefly internally suspended by the club for the incident.

Death of Richard Pratt
The club's immediate past president Richard Pratt died on 28 April, prior to Round 6, after his battle with prostate cancer. A long time benefactor of the club, Pratt had served as president from February 2007 until July 2008, and was a key off-field figure in Carlton's recovery from its poor condition in the mid-2000s to its return to the finals this year.

Following Pratt's death, the Carlton and Collingwood Football Clubs established the Richard Pratt Cup, a new trophy to presented in perpetuity to the winner of Carlton's annual home match against Collingwood, accompanying an event to raise money for the Pratt Foundation. The trophy was first contested in Round 17, and was won by Collingwood. The Richard Pratt Cup became a companion to the Peter Mac Cup, which had been contested annually between Carlton and Collingwood since 1993, and accompanied an event to raise money for the Peter MacCallum Cancer Centre. The teams had previously shared hosting duties, but with the establishment of the Richard Pratt Cup, Collingwood became the host of all Peter Mac Cup matches.

Round 7 – home game on the Gold Coast
Carlton played its Round 7 home match at Gold Coast Stadium in Queensland, in return for a guaranteed $400,000 payment from the AFL. After  – which had played three matches at the stadium in each of 2007 and 2008 – rejected a proposal to relocate permanently to the Gold Coast, the league offered to pay for Victorian clubs to shift home games there in 2009, in order to continue the league's presence in the area until the Gold Coast Suns could be entered the league in 2011. Carlton,  and  each accepted the $400,000 offer to play one game there during the 2009 season.

Round 14 – Livestrong yellow guernsey
In its away game against  at Subiaco Oval in Round 14, Carlton wore a once-off yellow Livestrong guernsey, instead of its normal white clash guernsey, to raise money for cancer research. Money raised in the event was divided between the Livestrong Foundation (then known as the Lance Armstrong Foundation) and the Peter MacCallum Cancer Centre. The guernseys were yellow with navy blue cuffs, collar, side-panels, monogram and numbers.

Brendan Fevola's behaviour at the Brownlow Medal
Brendan Fevola caused trouble when he drank excessively at the Brownlow Medal Count. He served as the host of The Footy Show's Street Talk segment, but was so obnoxiously drunk while filming it that the show did not air it. Already on his final disciplinary chance with Carlton following his indiscretion the previous season, the incident led to Fevola being traded to the Brisbane Lions in the offseason.

Individual awards and records

John Nicholls Medal
The Carlton Football Club Best and Fairest awards night took place on 28 September. The John Nicholls Medal, for the best and fairest player of the club, as well as several other awards, were presented on the night. Brendan Fevola, after his behaviour at the Brownlow Medal, did not attend the event.

John Nicholls Medal
The voting system for the John Nicholls Medal remained the same as in 2008. In each match, the five members of the Match Committee awarded votes. Each committee member could award votes to up to eight players, and each player could receive up to ten votes from each judge. A "perfect score" for a round is 50 votes. The player with the most total votes across all premiership season matches (including home and away matches and finals) wins the award.

The winner of the John Nicholls Medal was Chris Judd, who polled 558 votes. It was Judd's second consecutive John Nicholls Medal, in only his second season at the club, and was the second of three John Nicholls Medals that Judd would win consecutively from 2008 to 2010. Judd won comfortably ahead of Marc Murphy (451 votes) and Bryce Gibbs (415 votes). The top ten is given below.

Other awards
The following other awards were presented on John Nicholls Medal night:-
Best First-Year Player – Aaron Joseph
Best Clubman – David Ellard
Spirit of Carlton Encouragement Award – Jordan Russell

Coleman Medal
Brendan Fevola was the winner of the Coleman Medal as the league's leading goalkicker, kicking 86 goals in the home-and-away season to finish ahead of Brisbane's Jonathan Brown (78 goals) and 's Nick Riewoldt (68 goals). It was Fevola's second career Coleman Medal, after winning the award in 2006; in doing so, Fevola became the first Carlton player since George Coulthard in the 1878, 1879 and 1880 VFA seasons to win the league goalkicking more than once in his career, and the first Carlton player ever to achieve the feat in the VFL/AFL.

Brownlow Medal
Chris Judd finished second for the 2009 Brownlow Medal, polling 22 votes; he finished eight votes behind runaway winner Gary Ablett Jr.. Marc Murphy and Bryce Gibbs each polled 15 votes to finish equal-ninth.

AFLPA awards
For each of the AFLPA awards, one or three Carlton players were nominated following internal vote of Carlton players (except for Best Captain, where captain Chris Judd was nominated by default). Chris Judd went on to finish third for the Leigh Matthews Trophy; none of Carlton's other nominees placed.
Leigh Matthews Trophy (Most Valuable Player)
Bryce Gibbs (nominated)
Chris Judd (third place)
Marc Murphy (nominated)
Robert Rose Award (Most Courageous Player)
Simon Wiggins (nominated)
Best First Year Player
Aaron Joseph (nominated)
Best Captain
Chris Judd (nominated by default)

Other awards
All-Australian Team
The 40-man squad for the All-Australian Team was announced on 1 September 2009, and the final team of 22 was announced on 14 September 2010, with both Judd and Fevola named in the team.
 Brendan Fevola (full-forward)
 Chris Judd (ruck rover, vice captain)
 Marc Murphy (nominated in 40-man squad)

AFL Rising Star
Aaron Joseph was nominated for the 2009 AFL Rising Star award for his performance in Carlton's Round 12 win against . Joseph did not poll votes in the final count.

Representative honours
Chris Yarran was represented the Indigenous All-Stars team, which played a pre-season match against  on 7 February.

Australian Football Hall of Fame
Ken Hands, who played with Carlton from 1945 to 1957, then coached the club from 1959 to 1964, was inducted into the Australian Football Hall of Fame.

Player records
Round 5 – Brendan Fevola kicked his 500th career goal, the third player to do so for the Carlton Football Club, after Harry Vallence and Stephen Kernahan.
Round 15 – Brendan Fevola kicked nine goals in the match against . It was the highest goalkicking haul of Fevola's AFL career, after having previously kicked eight goals on eight separate occasions.

Northern Bullants 
The Carlton Football Club had a full affiliation with the Northern Bullants during the 2009 season. It was the seventh season of the clubs' affiliation, which had been in place since 2003. Carlton senior- and rookie-listed players who were not selected to play in the Carlton team were eligible to play for either the Northern Bullants seniors or reserves team, including both Victorian Football League matches. Home games were shared between the Bullants' traditional home ground, Preston City Oval, and Carlton's traditional home ground, Visy Park. Carlton development coach David Teague served also as the senior coach for the Bullants during the season.

The Bullants finished second out of fourteen in the VFL, after being defeated in the Grand Final by North Ballarat by 23 points. It was the Bullants' first Grand Final appearance since 1984. The Bullants had finished third on the ladder after the home-and-away season. Carlton rookie-listed player David Ellard, who did not play at AFL level during the season, won the Laurie Hill Trophy as the Bullants' best and fairest.

Notes
:1. Ratten also served as head coach in the final six rounds of 2007 as caretaker, before being officially appointed as head coach for 2008.

References

Carlton Football Club seasons
2009 in Australian rules football
2009 Australian Football League season